Britney Cimone Jones (born September 1, 1987) is an American professional basketball player. During her career she has won the national championship in Romania, Belgium, Switzerland and El Salvador.

Early life and high school
Jones grew up in Chicago, Chicago, Illinois and attended John Marshall Metropolitan High School. She was named the 2004–05 Athlete of the Year as well as Player of the Year by the Chicago Sun-Times while receiving all-state, all-area and all-city recognition from the Chicago Sun-Times. Marshall won the CPS City Championship in 2002 and 2004 while placing third in the state in 2002.

College career
Jones played college basketball for the UAB Blazers of the University of Alabama at Birmingham from 2005 to 2009.

Professional career
In 2011, Jones signed with Fjölnir of the Icelandic Úrvalsdeild kvenna. She was selected for the Icelandic All-Star game in January 2013 while also appearing in the three point competition where she finished second. During the season, she led the league with 29.3 points per game.
She returned to Fjölnir the following season and again led the league in scoring, averaging 31.6 points per game. On 20 February 2013, she scored 52 points in an overtime loss against Njarðvík.

She spent the 2017–2018 season with Royal Castors Braine, helping the team to the Belgian championship. After the playoffs, she signed with BCF Elfic Fribourg Basket, replacing injured Noémie Mayombo, and helped the team win the Swiss championship. The following season, she returned to Belgium and signed with Belfius Namur Capitale. She left Naumur-Capitale at the end of February 2019.

She started the 2019–20 season with Ślęza Wrocław where she averaged 11.4 points and 3.1 assists in 8 games. In January 2020, she signed with Hapoel Petah Tikva of the Ligat ha'Al.

Statistics

College statistics

Source

References

External links
Profile at Eurobasket.com
Icelandic statistics at Icelandic Basketball Association
SB League statistics at Swiss Basketball

1987 births
Living people
Basketball players from Chicago
American expatriate basketball people in Belgium
American expatriate basketball people in El Salvador
American expatriate basketball people in Iceland
American expatriate basketball people in Israel
American expatriate basketball people in Romania
American expatriate basketball people in Russia
American expatriate basketball people in Switzerland
American women's basketball players
Fjölnir women's basketball players
Point guards
Úrvalsdeild kvenna basketball players
21st-century American women